Christos Afroudakis (born 23 May 1984) is a Greek water polo player who competed in the 2004 Summer Olympics, the 2008 Summer Olympics, and the 2012 Summer Olympics.  

He was the captain of the team that competed for Greece at the 2016 Summer Olympics. They finished in 6th place.

His brother Georgios also competed for Greece at the Olympic level in water polo.

Afroudakis retired from the Greek Men's National Team after the 2016 Summer Olympics.

Clubs
 NC Vouliagmeni: 2002–2004
 CN Posillipo: 2004–2006
 Ethnikos Piraeus: 2006–2007
 Olympiacos: 2007–2011
 NC Vouliagmeni: 2011–2021

See also
 Greece men's Olympic water polo team records and statistics
 List of players who have appeared in multiple men's Olympic water polo tournaments
 List of World Aquatics Championships medalists in water polo

References

External links
 

1984 births
Living people
Greek male water polo players
Olympiacos Water Polo Club players
Olympic water polo players of Greece
Water polo players at the 2004 Summer Olympics
Water polo players at the 2008 Summer Olympics
Water polo players at the 2012 Summer Olympics
Water polo players at the 2016 Summer Olympics
World Aquatics Championships medalists in water polo
Mediterranean Games medalists in water polo
Mediterranean Games bronze medalists for Greece
Competitors at the 2013 Mediterranean Games

Ethnikos Piraeus Water Polo Club players
Water polo players from Athens
21st-century Greek people